MS Jean Nicoli is a RO/PAX French ferry owned and operated by Corsica Linea. The ship built in 1998 at Fosen Mek Verksteder A/S, Norway for Minoan Lines. Her first name was Pasiphae and then renamed Pasiphae Palace. Also she has a sister ship Cruise Smeralda previous name Ikarus Palace.

Minoan Lines Career 
The ship departed from Rissa, Norway on 13 June 1998 and arrived in Piraeus, Greece on 15 June 1998. The first christening became in Piraeus, Greece and after she departed from Piraeus and arrived in Heraklion, Crete which became the second christening. Her maiden voyage did it on 4 July 1998 on Patras-Igoumenitsa-Corfu-Venice route. During her maiden voyage, Pasiphae grounded on rocks near Corfu. The ship after the grounding went in Elefsina Shipyards for constructions. The ship entered in service again on 30 July. In 2001 renamed Pasiphae Palace and did the Patras-Igoumenitsa-Corfu-Venice route with her sister ship Ikarus Palace. The ship also did sometimes the Piraeus-Heraklion route.

SNCM onwards 
Pasiphae Palace sold to SNCM 19 January 2009. The ship changed her name into Jean Nicoli and the changings of the signals became in Elefsis Shipyards, Greece in March 2009. Jean Nicoli made her last departure from Greece with destination Marseille on 24 April 2009. Under SNCM did the Ajaccio-Porto Torres route and when the SNCM defunct the ship sold to Corsica Linea.

CORSICA LINEA 2017-present 
Jean Nicoli was sold in 2017 to Corsica Linea. The company repainted the ship but didn't change her name. In March 2020 Corsica Linea put scrubbers in Jean Nicoli at Piombino Shipyards, Malta.

Accidents 
 On 5 July 1998 during her maiden voyage Pasiphae grounded on the rocks a few nautical miles away from Corfu
 On 6 February 2008 Pasiphae Palace hit at the port of Heraklion, Crete
 On 11 December 2008 Pasiphae Palace hit at the port of Patras, Greece
 On 8 March 2017 Jean Nicoli hit by 15mm wave at the Cape Leone with big damages at the bridge and windows of the ship. Nobody from the passengers was injured.

Route 
Jean Nicoli is doing every day the Ajaccio-Marseille route.

References

Ships of France
Ferries of France
Ships built in Norway
1997 ships